Opicinus de Canistris (24 December 1296 – c. 1353), also known as the Anonymous Ticinensis, was an Italian priest, writer, mystic, and cartographer who generated a number of unusual writings and fantastic cosmological diagrams. Autobiographical in origin, they provide the majority of information about his life. When his works were rediscovered in the early twentieth century, some scholars deemed his works to be “psychotic” due to their extraordinary theological musings and schematic diagrams. The merits of this psychoanalytic interpretation, however, are currently under debate.

Biography

Northern Italy (1296-1329) 

Opicinus was born December 24, 1296, in Lomello, near Pavia, Italy. His family, which was well known in Pavia, actively supported the Guelphs against the Ghibellines.

He went to school from the age of six. He then studied liberal arts and progressively received an eclectic encyclopaedical training. From a very early age he was interested in drawing. He had several temporary jobs to materially help his family.

The storming of Pavia by the Ghibellines on October 8, 1315 forced Canistris' family to take exile in Genoa for three years. Opicinus then distanced himself from the Guelph part of his family, especially following the death of his father and one of his younger brothers.

In Genoa he studied theology and the Bible in greater depth and developed his talent for drawing. During this period he was able to see the first "sea maps" (incorrectly known as "portolans"). When he returned to Pavia in 1318, he studied to become a priest, and from 1319 he drew up religious treaties. He was ordained in Parma on February 27, 1320, and in 1323 obtained a modest parish in Pavia (Santa Maria Capella).

Between 1325 and 1328, his autobiography doesn't mention any event. Towards the end of this period, he wrote a treatise defending the supremacy of the papacy over the Empire (De preeminentia spiritualis imperii) against the ecclesiological views of Marsilius of Padua, then a close adviser to the emperor elect Lewis of Bavaria in whose hands Pavia had fallen. It is probably this which lead him to leave the city, and find refuge in the nearby Piemontese city of Valenza in the summer of 1329.

Avignon (1329 – circa 1353) 

During his stay in Valenza, he wrote a treatise on the issue of Christian poverty (which has not been preserved). Arrived in Avignon in April 1329, where the Papal Court was located he managed to present his treatise to Pope John XXII. Returning to Valenza, he revised the De preeminentia spiritualis imperii and submitted to the pope. While awaiting for some rewards for his efforts, Opicinus produced a description of the city of Pavia (De laudibus civitatis ticinensis).

He eventually obtained a position as scribe at the Apostolic Penitentiary on December 4, 1330. However soon after, a suit was brought against him before the Rota, by the new bishop of Pavia, Giovanni Fulgosi, as part of a wider effort to reorganize the local clergy. Little is known about the suit, as in his writings, Opicinus is quite vague about its nature.

Illness and visions 

On March 31, 1334 Opicinus suffered a serious illness in which he became comatose for nearly two weeks. When he recovered, he discovered that much of his memory was gone, that he could not speak and that his right hand was useless. He wrote,

Ultimately, Opicinus did recover his memory, speech and some function in his hand. He attributed this healing to a vision he experienced on August 15 (coincidentally the date of the feast of the assumption of the Virgin).

Opicinus believed that his illness was the result of hidden sins that had corrupted his body. However, he interpreted his recovery as spiritual gift that allowed him to reveal spiritual truth.

The “pictures” he refers to are a complex series of maps and schematic diagrams in two manuscripts currently held at the Vatican library, Palatinus 1993 and Vaticanus 6435. These drawings were a means for Opicinus to chart the spiritual realities that he believed were the underpinnings of the physical world.

Much scholarship has interpreted Opicinus’s illness as psychosomatic, specifically the product of schizophrenia. However, whatever symptomatology can be gleaned from Opicinus’s abstruse writings seems to suggest that he suffered a stroke in addition to potential psychotic episodes.

He died in Avignon around 1353.

Works

Writings prior to 1334 
These are treaties without drawings and known by the author's friends. Only De preeminentia spiritualis imperii (The primacy of spiritual power) and De laudibus Papie (Pavia eulogy) have survived to date in the form of copies. Their content is classical.
 1319: Liber metricus de parabolis Christi
 1320: De decalogo mandatorum
 1322: religious treaties
 1324: Libellus dominice Passionis secundum concordantiam IIII evangelistarum
 1329: De paupertate Christi, De virtutibus Christi, Lamentationes virginis Marie, De preeminentia spiritualis imperii
 1330: Tractatus dominice orationis, Libellus confessionis, De laudibus Papie
 1331: Tabula ecclesiastice hierarchie
 1332: De septiloquio virginis Marie
 1333: De promotionibus virginis Marie

Work after 1334 
Opicinus is best known for the two manuscripts he created following his illness, "BAV, Pal. lat. 1993" and "BAV, Vat. lat. 6435." These two manuscripts contain a variety of autobiographic drawings and writings which chart Opicinus's life and illness.

The Vaticanus latinus 6435 manuscript 

Opicinus wrote the Vaticanus latinus between June and November 1337 and subsequently inserted addita (the last in December 1352). This manuscript, which was only identified on the eve of World War II, was recently fully published and translated by the medievalist Muriel Laharie as well as several studies by the psychiatrist Guy Roux – a multi-disciplinary collaboration essential to examining this singular work.
 
The Vaticanus comes in the form of a paper codex with 87 folios, with only written text in the first half, text and drawings (often map based) in the second half. It is a very dense document.

This codex looks similar to a journal written in chronological order. However, its polymorphous content, which is difficult to decipher, bears witness to the encyclopaedic culture of its author. Opicinus used all his knowledge to construct a cosmic identity appearing in numerous guises; he is God, the Sun, the Pope, Europe, Avignon, etc. Its colour anthropomorphic maps of the Mediterranean area, precise and curiously organised, illustrate "good" and "bad" characters and animals on which he projects himself and his enemies. The use of symbols, his taste for dissimulating and manipulating (words, numbers, space), and his attraction to the obscene and scatological are omnipresent and relate strongly to similar themes found broadly in medieval culture.

The Palatinus latinus 1993 manuscript 
The Palatinus latinus, first identified in 1913, was the subject of a study by Richard Salomon in 1939, with a partial edition of the document and comments.

With 52 large colour drawings on parchment (often used on both sides) and covered with notes, Palatinus, 1993 apparently  relies much less on a cartographic format ; yet, invisible maps of the Mediterranean are underlying most of the diagrams, with sometimes only a few places expressed. The drawings are extremely schematic, using human figures covered in circles and ellipses. Opicinus also included a plethora of biblical quotations, calendars, astrological charts and medical imagery.

Some scholars (M. Laharie and G. Roux) claim that these drawings were produced later than the Vaticanus, with no firm basis. Only two diagrams are dated or connected to the 1350 Jubilee. Other evidences rather point to an early production of most of the other drawings, in 1335 or 1336, before the Vaticanus.

References

Further reading 
 Camille, Michael. “The Image and the Self: Unwriting Late Medieval Bodies,” in Framing Medieval Bodies. (ed.) Sarah Kay and Miri Rubin. New York, NY. Manchester University Press, 1994
 Gurevich, Aron Yakovlevich. “L'individualité au Moyen Age: le cas d'Opicinus de Canistris,” in Annales ESC: économies, sociétés, civilisations: (later Annales - Histoire, Sciences Sociales)  vol. 48:5, pp. 1263–1280, 1993
 Kris, Ernst. “A Psychotic Artist of the Middle Ages,” in Psychoanalytic Exploration in Art. New York, NY. International Universities Press, 1952
 Laharie (M.), Le journal singulier d’Opicinus de Canistris (1337 - circa. 1341), Vatican City, Bibliotheca Apostolica Vaticana, 2008, 2 volumes, LXXXVIII + 944 p., 47 ill.
 Laharie (M.), "Une cartographie ‘à la folie’ : le journal d’Opicinus de Canistris", in Mélanges de l'École française de Rome (Moyen Âge), Ecole française de Rome, 119, 2, 2007, p. 361-399.
 Morse, Victoria, A Complext Terrain: Church, Society and the Individual in the Thought of Opicino de Canistris. Unpublished dissertation completed at the University of California-Berkeley, 1996
 Morse, Victoria. “Seeing and Believing: The Problem of Idolatry in the Though of Opicino de Canistris,” in. Orthodoxie, Christianisme, Histoire. (ed.) Susanna Elm, Eric Rebillard, and Antonella Romano. Ecole Francois de Rome, 2000 pp. 163-176
 Morse, Victoria. “The Vita Mediocris: The Secular Priesthood in the Thought of Opicino de Canistris,” in Quaderni di Storia Religiosa pp. 257-82 Verona, Cierre Edizione, 1994
 Piron, Sylvain. Dialectique du monstre. Enquête sur Opicino de Canistris, Bruxelles, Zones sensibles, 2015, 208 p.
 Roux (G.), Opicinus de Canistris (1296–1352), prêtre, pape et Christ ressuscité, Paris, Le Léopard d’Or, 2005, 484 p.
 Roux (G.), Opicinus de Canistris (1296–1352), Dieu fait homme et homme-Dieu, Paris, Le Léopard d’Or, 2009, 310 p.
 Roux (G.) & Laharie (M.), Art et Folie au Moyen Âge. Aventures et Énigmes d’Opicinus de Canistris (1296-1351 ?), Paris, Le Léopard d’Or, 1997, 364 p., 94 ill.
 Salomon (R.G.), Opicinus de Canistris. Weltbild und Bekenntnisse eines Avignonesichen Klerikers des 14. Jahrunderts, London, The Warburg Institute, 1936, 2 volumes; reprint. Lichtenstein, Kraus Reprints, 1969, 292 p. + 89 ill.
 Tozzi (P.), Opicino e Pavia, Pavia, Libreria d’Arte Cardano, 1990, 76 p.
 Whittington, Karl. Body-Worlds: Opicinius de Canistris and the Medieval Cartographic Imagination. Toronto, Pontifical Institute of Medieval Studies, 2014, xii + 212 p, 45 ill.

External links

 Cathedral of Pavia from manuscript Vatican, Pal. Lat. 1993 in the website of the Metropolitan Museum of Art.
 Visual Metaphysics: Opicinus de Canistris, by Nathan Schneider
 Canistris Maps at cartographic-images.net

14th-century Italian Roman Catholic priests
Italian male writers
13th-century births
14th-century deaths